Vembanad is the longest lake in India, as well as the largest lake in the state of Kerala. The lake has an area of 230 square kilometers and a maximum length of 96.5 km. Spanning several districts in the state of Kerala, it is known as Vembanadu Lake in Kottayam, Vaikom, Changanassery, Punnamada Lake in Alappuzha, Punnappra, Kuttanadu and Kochi Lake in Kochi. Several groups of small islands including Vypin, Mulavukad, Maradu, Udayamperoor, Vallarpadam, Willingdon Island are located in the Kochi Lake portion. Kochi Port is built around the Willingdon Island and the Vallarpadam island.

Kuttanad, also known as The Rice Bowl of Kerala, has the lowest altitude in India, and is also one of the few places in world where cultivation takes place below sea level. Kuttanad lies on the southern portion of Vembanad.

The Nehru Trophy Boat Race is conducted in a portion of the lake. High levels of pollution have been noticed at certain hotspots of the Vembanad backwaters. The Government of India has identified the Vembanad wetland under the National Wetlands Conservation Programme.

Geography and hydrography

The Vembanad lake is 96.5 km long, making it the longest lake in the country.  The area of Vembanad backwater  shrinked from  230 km2 in 1968 to 179.25 km2 as of 1983. The lake is bordered by Alappuzha, Kottayam, and Ernakulam districts. It is situated at the sea level, and is separated from the Laccadive Sea by a narrow barrier island. Canals link the lake to other coastal lakes in the north and south. The lake surrounds the islands of Pathiramanal, Perumbalam and Pallippuram. The Vembanad Lake is approximately 14 kilometers wide at its widest point. The lake is a part of the Vembanad-Kol wetland system which extends from Alappuzha in the south to Azheekkode in the north,  making it by far, India's longest lake at just over 96.5 km in length. The lake is fed by 10 rivers flowing into it including the six major rivers of central Kerala namely the Achenkovil, Manimala, Meenachil river, Muvattupuzha river, Pamba and Periyar. The total area drained by the lake is 15,770 km², which accounts for 40% of the area of Kerala. Its annual surface runoff of 21,900 Mm accounts for almost 30% of the total surface water resource of the state.

The most popular location on the shores of the lake is the Kumarakom Tourist Village situated on the east coast of the lake.  The Kumarakom Bird Sanctuary is located on the northern fringes of Kumarakom village. The Vembanad Wetland system was included in the list of wetlands of international importance, as defined by the Ramsar Convention for the conservation and sustainable utilization of wetlands in 2002. It is the largest of the three Ramsar Sites in the state of Kerala. Vembanad lake has been heavily reclaimed over the course of the past century with the water spread area reducing from 290.85 km² in 1917 to 227 km² in 1971 and 213.28 km² in 1990. In the same period almost 63.62 km of erstwhile water spread were reclaimed primarily for the formation of polders and to enlarge the extent of the Wellington island of Cochin port. The lake faces a major ecological crisis and has reduced to 37 percent of its original area, as a result of land reclamation. 

A unique characteristic of the lake is the -long Thanneermukkom salt water barrier constructed as a part of the Kuttanad Development Scheme to prevent tidal action and intrusion of salt water into the Kuttanad low-lands. It is the largest mud regulator in India and essentially divides the lake into two parts – one with perennial brackish water and the other with fresh water from rivers draining into the lake. This barrier has helped farmers in Kuttanad by freeing the area of salinity and allowing them an additional crop in the dry season. The Thanneermukkom barrier is located at one of the narrower parts of the Vembanad Lake. Only two-thirds of the original number of gates are opened in July to release flood flow. These gates remain closed until mid-November. The main drawback of the structure has been the loss of opportunity for fish and prawns to migrate upstream, and also an increase in weed growth in the upstream, severely restricting the natural flushing of pollutants. The Thanneermukkom bund has also created ecological problems, primarily, the rampant propagation of the Water Hyacinth in fresh water.

Tourism
The lake has become a major tourist attraction. A generally safe destination, this place had just one incident of tourist harassment in 2004 as reported in The Times of India.

Houseboats 
Vembanad Lake is at the heart of Kerala Backwaters tourism with hundreds of houseboats (kettuvallams in Malayalam) plied on it and numerous resorts on its banks.

Bird Sanctuary 
The Kumarakom Bird Sanctuary is located on the east coast of the lake.

Boat Races 
During the months of August and September, the rivers in and near Kottayam turn into activity and attraction centers due to these Boat races, a Kerala Tradition. Snake boat races - the lakes and rivers come alive during Onam with this water sport. It's a sight to watch oarsmen (about a hundred in one boat), slice their way through the backwaters.

Lake Island  
The lake has a small island called Pathiramanal, which can be accessed only via a boat. Other major attraction is the island Kakkathuruth.

Inland transport
The Vembanad Wetland system has formed an intricate network of estuaries, lagoons and canals which spans over 196 km in the north–south and 29 km in the east–west directions. Almost all villages in these areas can be accessed via water transport. The major rivers of Muvattupuzha, Meenachil, Pamba and Achencovil rivers, are all navigable up to distances of about 30 km upstream in the tidal reach. The Kottappuram–Kollam segment of the west coast canal system has a major chunk passing through the Vembanad Lake and spans a total of 209 km.  It has been declared as a National Waterway.

Ecological importance

Vembanad Kol Wetland was included in the list of wetlands of international importance, as defined by the Ramsar Convention for the conservation and sustainable utilization of wetlands. It is home to more than 20,000 waterfowls – the third largest such population in India. It is also an ideal habitat for shrimps. Major livelihood activities of the people living on the shores of the lake include agriculture, fishing, tourism, inland navigation, coir retting, lime shell collection. The uncontrolled mining of shells from the lake bed is also posing a threat to the eco-system. The sewage effluents and the heavy load of organic material released from the neighboring areas including a medical college at Alappuzha are let into the water and are responsible for the decrease in dissolved oxygen content in the water in the water body.

Birds
Vembanad Wetland is hosting many migratory birds in the season. In addition to this, the fragile ecosystem carries more than 100 birds as natives. It comes in the way of Central Asian flyway. Tourism in this area is affecting the ecosystem and hence the life of 16 million people depending on it.

References

External links

Lakes of Kerala
History of Kerala
Lagoons of India
Ramsar sites in India
Periyar (river)
Tourist attractions in Ernakulam district
Tourism articles by importance
Lakes
Lakes articles by importance
Houseboats